Apamea albina is a moth of the family Noctuidae. It is native to California and Oregon in the United States. It lives in forests and oak savanna on serpentine soils.

The moth has a forewing length of 20 to 23 millimeters. It is red-brown in color with areas of white, black, and blue-gray. The hindwing is yellow-gray. The head and thorax are dark brown.

References

A
Moths of North America
Endemic fauna of the United States
Fauna of the California chaparral and woodlands
Natural history of Oregon
Moths described in 1874
Taxa named by Augustus Radcliffe Grote